Our Earthmen Friends is a French film released theatrically in April 2007 and produced by Claude Lelouch. It has been adapted from the play written by Bernard Werber Nos Amis Les Humains.

Plot
The film is shot as if extraterrestrials were making a documentary about humans. A voice-over gives the analysis of the extraterrestrials. This external point of view allows to analyze the human behavior. The aim is to make the beholder think about his condition of human being. Two couples are studied: the husband of the first couple and the wife of the second are trapped into an invisible cage while the two others are studied in their environment. Extraterrestrials are doing experiments on the two prisoners.

References

External links
 

2006 films
French science fiction films
2000s French films
Films directed by Claude Lelouch